Richard Benyon (born 1960) is a British Conservative Party politician, MP for Newbury.

Richard Benyon may also refer to:

Richard Benyon (gymnast) (born 1964), British Olympic gymnast
Richard Benyon of Madras (1698–1774), British merchant and colonial administrator
Richard Benyon (MP for Peterborough) (1746–1796), MP for Peterborough, son of the above
Richard Benyon De Beauvoir  Richard Powlett-Wrighte a.k.a. Richard Benyon (1769–1854), MP for Wallingford and High Sheriff of Berkshire, son of the above
Richard Fellowes Benyon a.k.a. Richard Fellowes (1811–1897), MP for and High Sheriff of Berkshire, nephew of the above
Richard Shelley Benyon a.k.a. Richard Shelley (1892–1976), Vice Admiral in the Royal Navy, High Sheriff of Buckinghamshire